The 1986 Limerick Senior Hurling Championship was the 92nd staging of the Limerick Senior Hurling Championship since its establishment by the Limerick County Board in 1887.

Kilmallock were the defending champions.

On 28 September 1986, Claughaun won the championship after a 1-09 to 0-09 defeat of Adare in the final. It was their 10th championship title overall and their first championship since 1971. It remains their last championship triumph.

Results

Final

References

Limerick Senior Hurling Championship
Limerick Senior Hurling Championship